The 2021–22 LPB season, also known as Liga Betclic for sponsorship reasons, was the 89th season of the premier Portuguese basketball league and the 14th season under the current Liga Portuguesa de Basquetebol (LPB) format. It started on 2 October 2021 with the regular season and ended on 11 June 2022 with the final.

Sporting CP was the defending champion which was swept by FC Porto in semifinals. SL Benfica won their 28th title earning their first title since the 2016–17 season.

Teams

Promotion and relegation (pre-season) 
A total of 12 teams contested the league, including 10 sides from the 2020–21 season and two promoted from the Proliga.

Teams promoted from Proliga
CD Póvoa
Illiabum Clube

Venues and locations

Regular season

League table

Second phase

Group A

Group B

Group C

Playoffs 

Source: FPB

Playout 

|}
Source: FPB

Final standings

Portuguese clubs in European competitions

References

External links
 Official website

Liga Portuguesa de Basquetebol seasons
Portuguese